The Beitou Museum or sometimes called Taiwan Folk Arts Museum is a museum in Beitou District, Taipei, Taiwan.

History

Empire of Japan
The museum building was originally built in 1921 as Kazan Hotel, the best hot spring hotel during the Japanese rule. During WWII, the hotel was used by Japanese Kamikaze squadron pilots, and the tatami room on the second floor was where they would have their last meal before the final flight of their lives.

Republic of China
After the handover of Taiwan to the Republic of China (ROC) in 1945, the ROC Ministry of Foreign Affairs took over the building and converted it into a dormitory. It was then later be given the name Old Moon Manor due to its use as the set for a traditional costume drama. The building was subsequently taken over by the museum founder and the Taiwan Folk Art and Antique House was established there, dedicated to preserving folk relics and aboriginal art from earlier times. The name was later changed to the current name Beitou Museum.

In 1998, the museum building was designated a historic site by the Taipei City Government. It is one of the largest freestanding wooden structures remaining in Taiwan from the Japanese colonial era. Restoration was made to the building starting 2002 for five years and the building was reopened to the public in 2008.

Exhibitions
 Taiwan Folk Art
 Taiwan Aboriginal Art
 Early Clothing and Textiles of Taiwan

Transportation
The museum is accessible within walking distance east from Xinbeitou Station of the Taipei Metro.

See also
 List of museums in Taiwan

References

External links

 

2008 establishments in Taiwan
Buildings and structures completed in 1921
Defunct hotels
Folk art museums and galleries
Hot springs of Taiwan
Museums established in 2008
Museums in Taipei